Martin Fribrock (born 28 August 1984) is a Swedish footballer midfielder who plays as a midfielder and winger for FC Andrea Doria. He latest club was Esbjerg fB.

Career 
Starting his football career in Askeröds IF he moved to Allsvenskan and Helsingborgs IF in 2000 at the age of 16, he stayed with the club for 4 seasons, in 2005 he moved to Halmstads BK, however he got his first season destroyed when he got his ACL torn before the season started, later in 2005 he returned and have almost started every game since.

Summer 2008 Martin moved to Esbjerg fB in the Danish Superliga.

His younger brother, Henrik Fribrock, also played for Helsingborgs IF, however not on senior level, and is currently playing for Kristianstads FF.

References

External links 
  Esbjerg fB profile
 
  HBK Profile
  Swedish FA Profile

1984 births
Living people
Swedish footballers
Helsingborgs IF players
Halmstads BK players
Esbjerg fB players
Allsvenskan players
Danish Superliga players
Swedish expatriate footballers
Expatriate men's footballers in Denmark
Association football midfielders